Dextran 70 is a type of fluid given by injection into a vein to expand blood volume. Specifically it is used for shock such as that caused by bleeding or burns when blood transfusions are not quickly available. However, it does not carry oxygen.

Common side effects include vomiting, fever, and joint pains. Other side effects include allergic reactions and poor blood clotting. It is not recommended in people with kidney failure, significant heart failure, or a clotting disorder. It is not recommended during pregnancy. It works by pulling fluid from the extravascular space into the blood vessels.

Dextran 70 was approved for medical use in 1947. It is on the World Health Organization's List of Essential Medicines. It comes in either sodium chloride solution or glucose solution.

References

External links 
 

World Health Organization essential medicines
Wikipedia medicine articles ready to translate